Amy Coney Barrett (born 1972) is an associate justice of the Supreme Court of the United States. Justice Barrett may also refer to:

Reginald Barrett (born 1944), justice of the Supreme Court of New South Wales
James Barrett (Vermont judge) (1814–1900), justice of the Vermont Supreme Court

See also
Judge Barrett (disambiguation)
Max Barrett (judge) (born 1971), judge of the High Court of Ireland